Bieśnik refers to the following places in Poland:

 Bieśnik, Gorlice County
 Bieśnik, Tarnów County